Izaak Walton Killam (July 23, 1885 – August 5, 1955) was a Canadian financier.

Early life
Born in Yarmouth, Nova Scotia, he was the son of William Dudman Killam and Arabella Hunter (Belle) Cann.

Business ventures
As a young banker with the Union Bank of Halifax, Killam became close friends with John F. Stairs and Max Aitken (Lord Beaverbrook) who put Killam in charge of his Royal Securities. In 1919, Killam bought out Aitken and took full control of the company.  Killam's business dealings primarily involved the financing of large pulp and paper and hydro-electric projects throughout Canada and Latin America. Killam was believed to be the richest man in Canada at the time.  One of his larger projects in his native province was the creation of the Mersey Paper Company Ltd. and its related electrical generating stations and shipping fleet.

In 1922 he married Dorothy Brooks Johnston. Notwithstanding his prodigious financial accomplishments, Killam was a very reserved man who eschewed publicity and was virtually unknown outside a small circle of close acquaintances. Killam died in 1955 at his Quebec fishing lodge. By then he was considered to be the richest man in Canada.

In 1927 Killam acquired The Mail and Empire newspaper and after reorganization it was later sold to the owners of The Globe, who merged it to create The Globe and Mail in 1936.

Philanthropy
Having no children, Killam and his wife devoted the greater part of their wealth to higher education in Canada. The Killam Trusts, established in the will of Mrs. Killam, are held by five Canadian universities: the University of British Columbia, University of Alberta, University of Calgary, Dalhousie University and McGill University.  The current market value of the Killam endowment is approximately CAD$400 million and it is used to fund scientific research and artistic ventures across Canada.

Dalhousie University in Halifax benefited the most, having received a $30 million bequest from Dorothy Killam's estate in 1965 ($214 million in 2011 when adjusted for inflation), representing 32% of her fortune.  The  Killam Memorial Library constructed between 1966 and 1971 at a cost of $7.3 million ($52 million in 2011) was designed by architect Leslie R. Fairn and remains an enduring legacy to this day.

Money from the Killam estate also went to establish Izaak Walton Killam Hospital for Children in Halifax and the Montreal Neurological Institute in Montreal.

When Killam died the government honoured his request to use his inheritance taxes and a large donation, coupled with those of Sir James H. Dunn, to establish the Canada Council for the Arts.

References

Further reading
 Canada's Mystery Man of High Finance, Douglas How, Hantsport: Lancelot Press, 1986.
 A Very Private Person: The Story of Izaak Walton Killam - and his wife Dorothy, Douglas How: Dalhousie Graphics, 1976

External links
Killam Trusts.ca 

1885 births
1955 deaths
People from Yarmouth, Nova Scotia